Anairetes is a genus containing the tit-tyrants, a group of small, mainly Andean birds, in the tyrant flycatcher family Tyrannidae. The group briefly included the genus Uromyias, which had been recognized based on syringeal and plumage characters, including a flatter crest and a longer tail, but was included within Anairetes due to genetic analysis. Recent analyses suggested splitting into Uromyias again.  
Anairetes is believed to be most closely related to the genera Mecocerculus and Serpophaga; however, there is no definitive evidence supporting this claim.

They are fairly small birds (11–14 cm) that get their common name from the tit family, due to their energetic tit-like dispositions and appearance, primarily in their crests. Species in this genus live in temperate or arid scrub habitats and are mainly found in the Andes mountains. It is one of only a few genera of small flycatchers that occur at such high altitudes.

Species
The genus contains 6 species:

References

Cited texts

See also
Tit-tyrants

 
Bird genera
Taxa named by Ludwig Reichenbach